The Mount Moriah Masonic Lodge No. 18 is a historic building in Lisbon, Arkansas, US.  The two-story wood frame lodge building was built in 1858, and is virtually unaltered.  It has several distinctive construction features, including 12" by 12" timber posts that rise the full two stories at its corners; this feature is believed to be unique in the state.  It was built as a meeting hall a local chapter of Freemasons, and is the oldest purpose-built Masonic hall still used for that purpose in Arkansas.

The building was listed on the National Register of Historic Places in 1987.

See also
National Register of Historic Places listings in Union County, Arkansas

References

Clubhouses on the National Register of Historic Places in Arkansas
Masonic buildings completed in 1858
Masonic buildings in Arkansas
National Register of Historic Places in Union County, Arkansas
1858 establishments in Arkansas